Clothing in Myanmar varies depending on the ethnicity, geography, climate and cultural traditions of the people of each region of Myanmar (Burma). The most widely recognized Burmese national costume is the longyi, which is worn by both males and females nationwide. Burmese clothing also features great diversity in terms of textiles, weaves, fibers, colours and materials, including velvet, silk, lace, muslin, and cotton.

History

Pre-colonial era

Pagan era 

During the Pagan dynasty, while cotton was the most commonly used textile material, other imported textiles such as silk, satin, and velvet, were also used in Burmese clothing. Trade with neighboring societies has been dated to the Pyu era, and certainly enriched the material culture, with imported textiles used for ritual and costume. For instance, the Mingalazedi Pagoda, built during the reign of Narathihapate, contains enshrined articles of satin and velvet clothing, which were not locally produced.

Pagan-era kings and princes wore robes called wutlon (ဝတ်လုံ), duyin (ဒုယင်), and thoyin (သိုရင်း) as upper garments, while wearing dhoti-like loinclothes as lower garments. Meanwhile aristocratic women wore strapless bodices called yinsi (ရင်စေ့) over a chemise, before adopting looser jackets and body garments, including longer sari-like garments and baggy trousers, that gained currency in the later Pagan period. Relative social rank was distinguished by the use of gold and silver embroidery patterns; high quality attire and floral designs were worn by the upper class and ruling class.

Konbaung era 

Dress was a major cultural aspect of life in pre-colonial Burmese kingdoms. Foreign travelers reported the presence of a loom in every household, enabling every women to weave their family's everyday clothing. Vincenzo Sangermano, an Italian priest who was posted in the Konbaung kingdom at the turn of the 19th century, observed that locals were "splendid and extravagant in their dress." Ear-boring ceremonies for girls was a major rite of passage. Locals adorned themselves with gold and silver, including rings set with precious stones, necklaces, bracelets, and anklets. These accessories accompanied traditional attire, consisting of a sarong-like wrap – paso for men or a htamein for women – both of which were made of cotton or silk. Wooden or leather sandals were worn as footwear. Men and women alike dressed in their finest attire, including ornamented jackets, for visits to pagodas and other important events.

Sumptuary laws called yazagaing dictated material consumption for Burmese subjects in the Konbaung kingdom, everything from the style of one's house to clothing appropriate for one’s social standing, from regulations concerning funerary ceremonies and the coffin to be used to usage of various speech forms based on rank and social status. In particular, sumptuary laws in the royal capital were exceedingly strict and the most elaborate in character. Sumptuary regulations governing dress and ornamentation were carefully observed as a means of reinforcing social hierarchy.

Designs with the peacock insignia were strictly reserved for the royal family and long-tailed hip-length htaingmathein jackets and surcoats were reserved for officials. Fabrics with metallic threads, sequins and embroidery were limited to royals, high-ranking officials, and tributary princes (sawbwa). Velvet sandals were only permitted to be worn by members of the royal family and ministers’ wives. Adornment with jewels and precious stones was similarly regulated. Usage of hinthapada, a vermilion dye made from cinnabar, was also regulated.

Colonial era 

The dawn of colonial rule led to the demise of sumptuary laws. Unlike in neighboring French Indochina, the Burmese monarchy was completely dismantled, creating an immediate vacuum for state sponsorship of material culture, institutions, and traditions. The colonial era ushered in a wave of non-aristocratic nouveau riche Burmese who sought to adopt the styles and costumes of the aristocrats of pre-colonial times.

During the British colonial era, clothing gained new meaning in Burmese life, as an expression of anti-colonial sentiment. Burmese nationalists associated traditional clothing, in particular Yaw longyi, a type of longyi from the Yaw region, and pinni taikpon, a fawn-coloured collarless jacket, with anti-colonialism and nationalist sentiment; Burmese who wore this characteristic outfit were arrested by British police. The wearing of "traditional" clothing was now seen as a mode of passive anti-colonial resistance among the Burmese. Inspired by Gandhi's Swadeshi movement, Burmese nationalists also waged campaigns boycotting imported goods, including clothing, to promote the consumption of locally-produced garments.

Clothing styles also evolved during the colonial era; the voluminous taungshay paso and htamein with its train, were abandoned in favor of a simpler longyi that was more convenient to wear. The female sarong (htamein) became shorter, no longer extending to the feet, but to the ankles, and the length of the sarong's topband decreased to reveal more waistline. This period also saw the introduction of a sheer muslin blouse for women, revealing a corset-like lace bodice called za bawli. British rule also influenced hair fashion and clothing. Western accessories such as belts and leather shoes were commonly worn with "traditional" attire. Cropped short hair, called bo ke replaced long hair as the norm among Burmese men. Similarly, women began wearing hairstyles like amauk, consisting of crested bangs curled at the top, with the traditional hair bun. The practice of traditional Burmese tattooing similarly declined in popularity.

Modern era 
The onset of independence reinforced the central role of clothing in Burmese national identity. While other Southeast Asian nations sought to "modernize" preferred clothing choices for their citizens (e.g., Siam with the cultural mandates, or Indonesia, with encouraging trousers over sarong for men), successive Burmese governments have encouraged the continued use of longyi by both men and women as daily wear. In a 1951 speech at the all-Burma Indian Cultural Conference, Burmese prime minister U Nu identified dress as one of the main distinctive markers of a nation, noting that national costume "carries with it that distinctive mark of culture of the rice or national which is its very backbone." The Burmese Way to Socialism continued to reinforced the practice of wearing traditional attire in favor of Western clothing.

National costumes

Longyi 

The national costume of Myanmar is the longyi, an ankle-length wraparound skirt worn by both males and females. The longyi in its modern form was popularized during the British colonial period, replacing the traditional paso worn by men and htamein worn by women in pre-colonial times.

The pre-colonial htamein features a broad train called yethina (ရေသီနား) and is only seen in modern times as wedding attire or a dance costume. Similarly, the pre-colonial paso is only commonly worn during stage performances, including dances and anyeint performances as well as wedding or high social events.

Acheik textiles 

The indigenous Burmese textile pattern, called acheik or luntaya acheik (လွန်းတစ်ရာအချိတ်), features intricate waves interwoven with bands of horizontal stripes, embellished with arabesque designs. Luntaya, which literally means a "hundred shuttles,"refers to the time-consuming, expensive, and complex process of weaving this pattern, which requires using 50 to 200 individual shuttles, each wound with a different color of silk. The weaving is labor-intensive, requiring at least two weavers to manipulate the shuttles to achieve the interwoven wave-like patterns.

Acheik is most commonly used as a textile for male paso or female htamein. The color palettes used in acheik incorporate a bold array of contrasting shades in a similar color range to create a shimmering trompe-l'œil effect. Designs for men feature simpler zig-zag, cable and interlocking lappet motifs, while those for women interweave undulating waves with arabesque embellishments such as floral motifs or creepers.

The towns of Amarapura and Wundwin remain major domestic centers of traditional acheik weaving, although in recent years, cheaper factory-produced imitations from China and India have significantly disrupted Myanmar's traditional cottage industry.

Acheik weaving originates in Amarapura, near the Pahtodawgyi pagoda. The name acheik may derive from the name of the quarter in which the weavers lived, Letcheik Row (လက်ချိတ်တန်း); the term itself was previously called waik (ဝိုက်), referring to the woven zig-zag pattern.

While some sources claim that the acheik pattern was introduced by Manipuri weavers during the late 1700s, there are no comparable Manipuri textiles that resemble acheik. The wave-like patterns may have in fact been inspired by Neolithic motifs and natural phenomena (i.e., waves, clouds, indigenous flora and fauna). Acheik-type designs are found on pottery dating back to the Pyu city states (400s-900s CE), as well as in temple wall paintings dating back to the Bagan Kingdom era (1000s-1200s CE). Tributary gifts bestowed to the Burmese royal court may also have provided an additional source of inspiration. The textile became popular during the Konbaung dynasty, during which sumptuary laws regulated who could wear acheik clothing. The acheik pattern was exclusively worn by members of the royal court, officials, and their entourages.

Taikpon jacket 

For business and formal occasions, Bamar men wear a Manchu Chinese jacket called a taikpon eingyi over a mandarin collar shirt. This costume was popularized during the colonial era.

Female eingyi 
Burmese women wear blouses called eingyi. There are two prevalent styles of eingyi: yinzi buttoned at the front, or yinbon, buttoned at the side. For formal and religious occasions, Burmese women typically don a shawl.

Htaingmathein jacket 

The most formal rendition of Myanmar's national costume for females includes a buttonless tight-fitting hip-length jacket called htaingmathein, sometimes with flared bottoms and embroidered sequins. Htaingmathein in Burmese literally means "does not gather while sitting," referring to the fact that the tight-fitting jacket does not crumple up when sitting. This jacket was popular among the aristocratic classes during the Konbaung dynasty and modern day upper classes, and is now most commonly worn by females as wedding attire, or as traditional dance costume as well as high social events sometimes. The htaingmathein is worn over a bodice called yinkhan. Historically, the htaingmathein also had a pair of pendulous appendages on both sides called kalano.

Gaungbaung 

The Burmese national costume for men includes a kerchief called gaung baung, which is worn for formal functions. During the colonial era, the gaung baung was streamlined as an article of formal attire. The design of the modern Burmese gaung baung emerged in the mid-1900s and is called maung kyetthayay. It is a ready-made gaung baung made of cloth wrapped in a rattan frame and can be worn like a hat is worn.

Formal footwear 

Both genders wear velvet sandals called gadiba phanat (‌, also called Mandalay phanat) as formal footwear.

Regional costumes
The various ethnic groups of Myanmar all have distinct clothing and textile traditions. The ethnic costumes across most Burmese ethnic groups generally consist of a sarong-like longyi using various patterns or textiles.

Chin peoples

The Chin peoples are a heterogenous collection of ethnic groups that generally live in western Myanmar and speak related Kuki-Chin languages.  Chin women generally wear ankle-length longyis using various textiles, and front-opening blouses, in addition to accessories like metallic belts. Chin men wear generally shirts and trousers, over which a blanket-like wrap is worn, as traditional attire.

Kachin peoples

The Kachin peoples are a heterogenous collection of ethnic groups that live in northern Myanmar (Kachin State), with each ethnic group possessing their own variation of traditional attire. Generally speaking, Kachin men and women wear longyis featuring geometric or checkered patterns associated with handwoven Kachin textiles. Jingphaw women also adorn themselves with metallic shawls studded with silver coins over their blouses.

Karen peoples
The Karen peoples are a heterogenous collection of ethnic groups that live in eastern Myanmar (Kayin State and Mon State) and in the Irrawaddy Delta. For traditional attire, Karen men traditionally wear headdresses with tassels hanging loose on the right side of the head, as well as sleeveless tunics over longyis. Karen women dress in long tunics and longyis, with headbands that have both ends hanging in the front. Karen longyis have horizontal stripes with a parallel strip in the middle.

Kayah people 

The Karenni people (also known as the Kayah) of both genders don headdresses; Kayah women wear red headdresses, while Kayah men wear white headdresses. Kayah women also wear red cloaks over sleeveless blouses and red or black longyis. Karen men wear baggy trousers or longyis, and may accessorize with silver daggers on special occasions.

Mon people

Mon women traditionally wear a shawl called yat toot, which is wrapped diagonally over the chest covering one shoulder with one end dropping behind the back. Archaeological evidence from the Dvaravati era (direct ancestors of the Mon people) portrays ladies wearing what seems to be a similar shawl hanging from their shoulder. Mon men traditionally wear red-checkered longyis, collarless shirts, and traditional jackets similar to Bamar men. Mon women traditionally wear their hair in a bun, wrapped around a comb.

Rakhine people

The Rakhine (Arakanese) people of both genders traditionally wear longyis. As traditional attire, Rakhine men also wear collarless shirts and taikpon jackets similar to Bamar men, and kerchiefs called gaung baung, with excess cloth draped to the left. Rakhine women wear blouses over a htaingmathein jacket, over which a sheer shawl is diagonally wrapped, passing over one shoulder.

Shan people
The traditional attire of the Shan people varies across locales. Generally speaking, Shan men wear baggy khaki trousers similar to fisherman pants, and a headwrap. Shan women wear longyis with embroidered designs and textiles associated with their hometowns.

See also
 Culture of Myanmar
Pinni (cloth)
 Folk costume

References

Work cited
 
 

 
Burma
Ceremonial clothing
Burmese culture